The 2014 Wisconsin Fall General Election was held in the U.S. state of Wisconsin on November 4, 2014. Wisconsin's Governor, Lieutenant Governor, Attorney General, Secretary of State, and State Treasurer were all up for election, as well as Wisconsin's eight seats in the United States House of Representatives. The November general election in 2014 also featured a statewide referendum on an amendment to the Constitution of Wisconsin.  The 2014 Wisconsin Fall Primary Election was held on August 12, 2014.

The Republican Party of Wisconsin held onto all statewide offices up for election in 2014, except for Secretary of State, where Democrat Doug La Follette won his tenth term.  Republicans also retained control of the Wisconsin State Senate and Wisconsin State Assembly.  The partisan breakdown of Wisconsin's delegation to the United States House of Representatives was unchanged, remaining five Republicans and three Democrats.

For nonpartisan local and judicial seats, the 2014 Wisconsin Spring General Election was held April 1, 2014.  No Wisconsin Supreme Court seats were up in 2014, but three seats on the Wisconsin Court of Appeals and 41 Wisconsin Circuit Court seats were up.  The 2014 Wisconsin Spring Primary Election was held on February 18.

Federal

Senate
Neither of Wisconsin's United States Senate seats were up for election in 2014.

House of Representatives

All 8 of Wisconsin's congressional districts will be up for election in November. All eight incumbent Representatives are running for reelection, save for District 6, where incumbent Tom Petri was retiring.  Party composition remained unchanged after the general election.

State

Governor and Lieutenant Governor

Incumbent Republican Governor Scott Walker and Lieutenant Governor Rebecca Kleefisch, first elected in 2010, sought re-election to a second term after surviving a recall election in 2012.

The Democratic Party nominated business executive Mary Burke and state senator John Lehman for Governor and Lieutenant Governor, respectively.  Burke was a member of the Madison school board and former Secretary of Wisconsin's Department of Commerce.  Lehman was a state senator and former teacher from Racine, who had just won back his senate seat in a recall election.

Walker and Kleefisch won the November election with 52% of the vote.

Attorney General
Republican incumbent Attorney General J. B. Van Hollen, first elected in 2006, did not seek re-election to a third term.  Waukesha County District Attorney Brad Schimel defeated Jefferson County District Attorney Susan Happ in the November general election.

Republican primary
Brad Schimel, Waukesha County District Attorney, ran unopposed for the Republican nomination.

Democratic primary

Candidates
Susan Happ, Jefferson County District Attorney
Jon Richards, State Representative
Ismael Ozanne, Dane County District Attorney

Endorsements

Results

General election

Candidates
Brad Schimel, Waukesha County District Attorney (R)
Susan Happ, Jefferson County District Attorney (D)
Thomas Nelson (L)

Polling

Results

| colspan="6" style="text-align:center;background-color: #e9e9e9;"| General Election, November 4, 2014

Secretary of State
Democratic Incumbent Doug La Follette was re-elected to his tenth term as Secretary of State of Wisconsin, taking 50% of the vote in the November general election.  La Follette defeated La Crosse Republican Julian Bradley.  State Representative Garey Bies was defeated in the Republican primary.

Democratic primary
Incumbent Doug La Follette ran unopposed for the Democratic nomination.

Republican primary

Candidates
Julian Bradley, Telecommunications manager
Garey Bies, State Representative

Results

General election

Candidates
Doug La Follette, Incumbent (D)
Julian Bradley, Telecommunications manager (R)
Andy Craig, Deputy Director, Wisconsin Liberty Coalition (L)
Jerry Broitzman (C)

Polling

Results

| colspan="6" style="text-align:center;background-color: #e9e9e9;"| General Election, November 4, 2014

Treasurer
Republican Incumbent State Treasurer Kurt W. Schuller, first elected in 2011, did not seek re-election to a second term.  In the November general election, Republican Wisconsin legislative staffer Matt Adamczyk defeated Democrat Dave Sartori, a former Greenfield alderman.

Republican primary

Candidates
Matt Adamczyk, legislative staffer
Randall Melchert, attorney

Results

Democratic primary

Candidates
Dave Leeper, former Green County District Attorney
Dave Sartori, former Greenfield alderman

Results

General election

Candidates
Matt Adamczyk, legislative staffer (R)
Dave Sartori, former Greenfield alderman (D)
Jerry Shidell, former Rhinelander mayor (L)
Andrew Zuelke, businessman (C)
Ron Hardy, Winnebago County Supervisor (G)

Polling

Results

| colspan="6" style="text-align:center;background-color: #e9e9e9;"| General Election, November 4, 2014

Legislature

State Senate
17 of the Wisconsin State Senate's 33 seats were up for election in the November general election.  Republicans added one seat to their majority, retaking the 21st senate district which had been lost in the 2012 recall elections.

Summary

Full Results

State Assembly
All 99 seats of the Wisconsin State Assembly were up for election in November.  21 Assembly incumbents (14 Republicans, 7 Democrats) did not seek re-election.

Judiciary

State Court of Appeals
Three seats on the Wisconsin Court of Appeals were up for election in 2014.  None of the three elections was contested.
 In District I, Judge Patricia S. Curley was re-elected to her fourth term.
 In District II, Judge Lisa Neubauer was re-elected to her second full term.
 In District IV, Judge Gary Sherman was elected to his first full term.  Judge Sherman had been appointed to the court in 2010 by Governor Jim Doyle.

State Circuit Courts
Forty one of the state's 249 circuit court seats were up for election in 2014.  Four of those elections were contested.

Constitutional Amendments

Transportation Fund
In the November election, Wisconsin voters overwhelmingly approved an amendment to the Constitution of Wisconsin to establish a dedicated transportation fund administered by the Wisconsin Department of Transportation.  The amendment also specified that none of the money which flowed into the fund, collected by transportation fees or taxes, could be appropriated to any other program.  Critics argued that purpose of the amendment was to create budget inflexibility that would force legislators to raid education funds to balance the budget.

Personhood Amendment
There was an attempt to amend the Constitution of Wisconsin to establish a right to life.  This amendment did not ultimately make it onto the ballot in 2014, as it did not obtain a necessary vote in the 101st Wisconsin Legislature.

Local

References

 
Wisconsin
Wisconsin State Legislature elections